Samuel Dashiell Hammett (May 27, 1894 – January 10, 1961) was an American writer of hard-boiled detective novels and short stories. He was also a screenwriter and political activist. Among the enduring characters he created are Sam Spade (The Maltese Falcon), Nick and Nora Charles (The Thin Man), The Continental Op (Red Harvest and The Dain Curse) and the comic strip character Secret Agent X-9.

Hammett "is now widely regarded as one of the finest mystery writers of all time". In his obituary in The New York Times, he was described as "the dean of the... 'hard-boiled' school of detective fiction." Time included Hammett's 1929 novel Red Harvest on its list of the 100 best English-language novels published between 1923 and 2005. In 1990, the Crime Writers' Association picked three of his five novels for their list of The Top 100 Crime Novels of All Time. Five years later, four out of five of his novels made The Top 100 Mystery Novels of All Time as selected by the Mystery Writers of America. His novels and stories also had a significant influence on films, including the genres of private eye/detective fiction, mystery thrillers, and film noir.

Early life
Hammett was born near Great Mills on the "Hopewell and Aim" farm in Saint Mary's County, Maryland, to Richard Thomas Hammett and his wife Anne Bond Dashiell. His mother belonged to an old Maryland family, whose name in French was De Chiel. He had an elder sister, Aronia, and a younger brother, Richard Jr. Known as Sam, Hammett was baptized a Catholic and grew up in Philadelphia and Baltimore.  Hammett's family moved to Baltimore when he was four years old in 1898, and for the most part, it was the city where he lived until he left permanently in 1920 when was 26 years old.  As a teen, Hammett attended the Baltimore Polytechnic Institute, but his formal education ended during his first year of high school; he dropped out in 1908 due to his father's declining health and the need for him to earn money to support the family.

He left school when he was 13 years old and held several jobs before working for the Pinkerton National Detective Agency. He served as an operative for Pinkerton from 1915 to February 1922, with time off to serve in World War I. While working for the Pinkerton Detective Agency in Baltimore, he learned the trade and worked in the Continental Trust Building (now known as One Calvert Plaza). He said that while with the Pinkertons he was sent to Butte, Montana, during the union strikes, though some researchers doubt this really happened. The agency's role in strike-breaking eventually left him disillusioned.

Hammett enlisted in the United States Army in 1918 and served in the Motor Ambulance Corps. He was afflicted during that time with the Spanish flu and later contracted tuberculosis. He spent most of his time in the Army as a patient at Cushman Hospital in Tacoma, Washington, where he met a nurse, Josephine Dolan, whom he married on July 7, 1921, in San Francisco.

Marriage and family
Hammett and Dolan had two daughters, Mary Jane (born 1921) and Josephine (born 1926). Shortly after the birth of their second child, health services nurses informed Dolan that, owing to Hammett's tuberculosis, she and the children should not live with him full time. Dolan rented a home in San Francisco, where Hammett would visit on weekends. The marriage soon fell apart; however, he continued to financially support his wife and daughters with the income he made from his writing.

Career and personal life

Hammett was first published in 1922 in the magazine The Smart Set. Known for the authenticity and realism of his writing, he drew on his experiences as a Pinkerton operative. Hammett wrote most of his detective fiction while he was living in San Francisco in the 1920s; streets and other locations in San Francisco are frequently mentioned in his stories. He said, "I do take most of my characters from real life." His novels were some of the first to use dialogue that sounded authentic to the era. "I distrust a man that says when. If he's got to be careful not to drink too much, it's because he's not to be trusted when he does."

The bulk of his early work, featuring a nameless private investigator, The Continental Op, appeared in leading crime-fiction pulp magazine Black Mask. Both Hammett and the magazine struggled in the period when Hammett became established.

Because of a disagreement with editor Philip C. Cody about money owed from previous stories, Hammett briefly stopped writing for Black Mask in 1926. He then took a full-time job as an advertisement copywriter for the Albert S. Samuels Co., a San Francisco jeweller. He was wooed back to writing for the Black Mask by Joseph Thompson Shaw, who became the new editor in the summer of 1926. Hammett dedicated his first novel, Red Harvest, to Shaw and his second novel, The Dain Curse, to Samuels. Both these novels and his third, The Maltese Falcon, and fourth, The Glass Key,  were first serialized in Black Mask before being revised and edited for publication by Alfred A. Knopf. The Maltese Falcon, considered to be his best work, is dedicated to his wife Josephine.

For much of 1929 and 1930, he was romantically involved with Nell Martin, a writer of short stories and several novels. He dedicated The Glass Key to her, and in turn she dedicated her novel Lovers Should Marry to him. In 1931, Hammett embarked on a 30-year romantic relationship with the playwright Lillian Hellman. Though he sporadically continued to work on material, he wrote his final novel in 1934, more than 25 years before his death. The Thin Man is dedicated to Hellman. Why he moved away from fiction is not certain; Hellman speculated in a posthumous collection of Hammett's novels, "I think, but I only think, I know a few of the reasons: he wanted to do new kind of work; he was sick for many of those years and getting sicker." In the 1940s, Hellman and he lived at her home, Hardscrabble Farm, in Pleasantville, New York.

Raymond Chandler, often considered Hammett's successor, summarized his accomplishments in The Simple Art of Murder:
Hammett was the ace performer, but there is nothing in his work that is not implicit in the early novels and short stories of Hemingway. Yet for all I know, Hemingway may have learned something from Hammett, as well as from writers like Dreiser, Ring Lardner, Carl Sandburg, Sherwood Anderson and himself....

Hammett gave murder back to the kind of people that commit it for reasons, not just to provide a corpse; and with the means at hand, not with hand-wrought dueling pistols, curare, and tropical fish... He is said to have lacked heart, yet the story he thought most of himself [The Glass Key] is the record of a man's devotion to a friend. He was spare, frugal, hard-boiled, but he did over and over again what only the best writers can ever do at all. He wrote scenes that seemed never to have been written before.

The French novelist André Gide thought highly of Hammett, stating: "I regard his Red Harvest as a remarkable achievement, the last word in atrocity, cynicism and horror. Dashiell Hammett's dialogues, in which every character is trying to deceive all the others and in which the truth slowly becomes visible through a fog of deception, can be compared only with the best in Hemingway."

Politics and service in World War II
Hammett devoted much of his life to left-wing activism. He was a strong antifascist throughout the 1930s, and in 1937 joined the Communist Party. On May 1, 1935, Hammett joined the League of American Writers (1935–1943), whose members included Lillian Hellman, Alexander Trachtenberg of International Publishers, Frank Folsom, Louis Untermeyer, I. F. Stone, Myra Page, Millen Brand, Clifford Odets, and Arthur Miller. (Members were largely either Communist Party members or fellow travelers.) He suspended his anti-fascist activities when, as a member (and in 1941 president) of the League of American Writers, he served on its Keep America Out of War Committee in January 1940 during the period of the Molotov–Ribbentrop Pact.

Especially in Red Harvest, literary scholars have seen a Marxist critique of the social system. One Hammett biographer, Richard Layman, calls such interpretations "imaginative", but he nonetheless objects to them, since, among other reasons, no "masses of politically dispossessed people" are in this novel. Herbert Ruhm found that contemporary left-wing media already viewed Hammett's writing with skepticism, "perhaps because his work suggests no solution: no mass-action... no individual salvation... no Emersonian reconciliation and transcendence". In a letter of November 25, 1937, to his daughter Mary, Hammett referred to himself and others as "we reds". He confirmed, "in a democracy all men are supposed to have an equal say in their government", but added that "their equality need not go beyond that." He also found, "under socialism there is not necessarily... any leveling of incomes."

Hellman wrote that Hammett was "most certainly" a Marxist, though a "very critical Marxist" who was "often contemptuous of the Soviet Union" and "bitingly sharp about the American Communist Party", to which he was nevertheless loyal.

At the beginning of 1942, he wrote the screenplay of Watch on the Rhine, based on Hellman's successful play,  which received a nomination for the Academy Award for Best Writing (Adapted Screenplay). But that year the Oscar went to Casablanca. In early 1942, following the attack on Pearl Harbor, Hammett again enlisted in the United States Army. Because he was 48 years old, had tuberculosis, and was a Communist, Hammett later stated he had "a hell of a time" being inducted into the Army. However, biographer Diane Johnson suggests that confusion over Hammett's forenames was the reason he was able to re-enlist. He served as an enlisted man in the Aleutian Islands and initially worked on cryptanalysis on the island of Umnak. For fear of his radical tendencies, he was transferred to the Headquarters Company where he edited an Army newspaper entitled The Adakian. In 1943, while still a member of the military, he co-authored The Battle of the Aleutians with Cpl. Robert Colodny, under the direction of an infantry intelligence officer, Major Henry W. Hall. While in the Aleutians, he developed emphysema.

After the war, Hammett returned to political activism, "but he played that role with less fervour than before". He was elected president of the Civil Rights Congress (CRC) on June 5, 1946, at a meeting held at the Hotel Diplomat in New York City, and "devoted the largest portion of his working time to CRC activities".

In 1946, a bail fund was created by the CRC "to be used at the discretion of three trustees to gain the release of defendants arrested for political reasons." The trustees were Hammett, who was chairman, Robert W. Dunn, and Frederick Vanderbilt Field.

The CRC was designated a Communist front group by the US Attorney General. Hammett endorsed Henry A. Wallace in the 1948 United States presidential election.

Imprisonment and the blacklist

The CRC's bail fund gained national attention on November 4, 1949, when bail in the amount of "$260,000 in negotiable government bonds" was posted "to free eleven men appealing their convictions under the Smith Act for criminal conspiracy to teach and advocate the overthrow of the United States government by force and violence." On July 2, 1951, their appeals exhausted, four of the convicted men fled rather than surrender themselves to federal agents and begin serving their sentences. The United States District Court for the Southern District of New York issued subpoenas to the trustees of the CRC bail fund in an attempt to learn the whereabouts of the fugitives.

Hammett testified on July 9, 1951, in front of United States District Court Judge Sylvester Ryan, facing questioning by Irving Saypol, the United States Attorney for the Southern District of New York, described by Time as "the nation's number-one legal hunter of top Communists". During the hearing, Hammett refused to provide the information the government wanted, specifically the list of contributors to the bail fund, "people who might be sympathetic enough to harbor the fugitives." Instead, on every question regarding the CRC or the bail fund, Hammett declined to answer, citing the Fifth Amendment, refusing to even identify his signature or initials on CRC documents the government had subpoenaed. As soon as his testimony concluded, Hammett was found guilty of contempt of court.

Hammett served time in a West Virginia federal penitentiary, where, according to Lillian Hellman, he was assigned to clean toilets. Hellman noted in her eulogy of Hammett that he submitted to prison rather than reveal the names of the contributors to the fund because "he had come to the conclusion that a man should keep his word."

By 1952, Hammett's popularity had declined as result of the hearings. He found himself impoverished due to a combination of the cancellation of radio programs The Adventures of Sam Spade and The Adventures of the Thin Man, and a lien on his income by the Internal Revenue Service for back taxes owed since 1943. Furthermore, his books were no longer in print.

Later years and death
During the 1950s Hammett was investigated by Congress. He testified on March 26, 1953, before the House Un-American Activities Committee about his own activities, but refused to cooperate with the committee. No official action was taken, but his stand caused him to be blacklisted, along with others who were blacklisted as a result of McCarthyism.

Hammett became an alcoholic before working in advertising, and alcoholism continued to trouble him until 1948, when he quit under doctor's orders. However, years of heavy drinking and smoking worsened the tuberculosis he contracted in World War I, and then, according to Hellman, "jail had made a thin man thinner, a sick man sicker ... I knew he would now always be sick."

Hellman wrote that during the 1950s, Hammett became "a hermit", his decline evident in the clutter of his rented "ugly little country cottage", where "signs of sickness were all around: now the phonograph was unplayed, the typewriter untouched, the beloved foolish gadgets unopened in their packages." He may have meant to start a new literary life with the novel Tulip, but left it unfinished, perhaps because he was "just too ill to care, too worn out to listen to plans or read contracts. The fact of breathing, just breathing, took up all the days and nights." Hammett could no longer live alone, and they both knew it, so he spent the last four years of his life with Hellman. "Not all of that time was easy, and some of it very bad", she wrote, but, "guessing death was not too far away, I would try for something to have afterwards."

Hammett died in Lenox Hill Hospital in Manhattan on January 10, 1961, of lung cancer, diagnosed just two months before.

A veteran of both world wars, Hammett is buried at Arlington National Cemetery.

Archive
Many of Hammett's papers are held by the Harry Ransom Center at the University of Texas at Austin. This archive includes manuscripts and personal correspondence, along with a small group of miscellaneous notes.

The Irvin Department of Rare Books and Special Collections at the University of South Carolina holds the Dashiell Hammett family papers.

Legacy
Hammett's relationship with Lillian Hellman was portrayed in the 1977 film Julia. Jason Robards won an Oscar for his depiction of Hammett, and Jane Fonda was nominated for her portrayal of Lillian Hellman.

Hammett was the subject of a 1982 prime time PBS biography, The Case of Dashiell Hammett, that won a Peabody Award and a special Edgar Allan Poe Award from the Mystery Writers of America.

Frederic Forrest portrayed Hammett semifictionally as the protagonist in the 1982 film Hammett, based on the novel of the same name by Joe Gores.

Sam Shepard played Hammett in the 1999 Emmy-nominated biographical television film Dash and Lilly along with Judy Davis as Hellman.

Hammett's influence on popular culture has continued well after his death.  For example, in 1975, the film The Black Bird starred George Segal in the role of Sam Spade, Jr.; the film was a sequel and parody of the Maltese Falcon. The 1976 comedic film Murder by Death spoofed a number of famous literary sleuths, including several of Hammett's.  The film's characters included Sam Diamond and Dick and Dora Charleston, which were parodies of Hammett's Sam Spade and Nick and Nora Charles. In 2006, Rachel Cohn published the YA novel, Nick & Norah's Infinite Playlist, whose main characters were named for the sleuths in Hammett's Thin Man series. The book was made into a film of the same name and released in 2008. Later, Rachel Cohn and David Levithan authored several books whose main characters are named for Hammett and his partner. In 2011, they published the YA suspenseful romance, Dash & Lily's Book of Dares.  That was followed by the sequels The Twelve Days of Dash and Lily in 2016 and Mind the Gap, Dash & Lily in 2020. The book series was made into a Netflix television series.

Bibliography

There is an almost complete bibliography by Richard Layman. This list is an updated listing of the works described in Dashiell Hammett: A Descriptive Bibliography. Hammett's entry in American Hard Boiled Crime Writers also contains a bibliography.

Novels

Short stories with serialized characters
The Continental Op

Sam Spade
 The Maltese Falcon (initially a 5 part serial from September 1929 to January 1930 in Black Mask)
 "A Man Called Spade" (July, 1932, The American Magazine; also collected in A Man Called Spade and Other Stories)
 "Too Many Have Lived" (October, 1932, The American Magazine; also collected in A Man Called Spade and Other Stories)
 "They Can Only Hang You Once" (November 19, 1932, Collier's; also in A Man Called Spade and Other Stories)
 "A Knife Will Cut for Anybody" (Unpublished fragment – posthumously published in The Hunter and Other Stories)

Nick and Nora Charles
 The First Thin Man (November 4, 1975, City Magazine)
 After the Thin Man (Screen story submitted to MGM September 17, 1935; first published in Return of the Thin Man)
 Another Thin Man (Screen story submitted to MGM May 13, 1938; first published in Return of the Thin Man)
 Sequel to the Thin Man (Screen story submitted to MGM December 7, 1938; first published in Return of the Thin Man)

Other short stories

 "The Parthian Shot", The Smart Set, October 1922
 "Immortality", 10 Story Book, November 1922
 "The Barber and His Wife", Brief Stories, December 1922
 "The Road Home", Black Mask December 1922
 "The Master Mind", The Smart Set, January 1923
 "The Sardonic Star of Tom Doody", Brief Stories, February 1923
 "The Vicious Circle", Black Mask June 1923
 "The Joke on Eoloise Morey", Brief Stories, June 1923
 "Holiday", New Pearsons, July 1923
 "The Crusader", The Smart Set, August 1923
 "The Green Elephant", The Smart Set, October 1923
 "The Dimple", Saucy Stories, October 1923
 "The Second-Story Angel", Black Mask, November 1923
 "Laughing Masks", Action Stories, November 1923
 "The Man Who Killed Dan Odams", Black Mask, January 1924
 "Itchy", Brief Stories, January 1924
 "Night Shots", Black Mask, February 1924
 "The New Racket", Black Mask, February 1924
 "Esther Entertains", Brief Stories, February 1924
 "Afraid of a Gun", Black Mask, March 1924
 "Who Killed Bob Teal?", True Detective Mysteries, November 1924
 "Nightmare Town", Argosy All-Story Weekly, December 1924
 "Another Perfect Crime", Experience, January 1925
 "Ber-Bulu", Sunset, March 1925
 "Ruffian's Wife", Sunset, October 1925
 "The Glass That Laughed", True Police Stories, November 1925
 "The Assistant Murderer", Black Mask, February 1926
 "The Advertising Man Writes a Love Letter", Judge, February 1927
 "The Diamond Wager", Detective Fiction Weekly, October 1929
 "On the Way", Harper's Bazaar, March 1932
 "Woman in the Dark", Liberty April, 8, 15 and 22, 1933
 "Night Shade", Mystery League Magazine, October 1933
 "Albert Pastor at Home", Esquire, Autumn 1933
 "Two Sharp Knives", Collier's, January 1934
 "His Brother's Keeper", Collier's, February 1934
 "This Little Pig", Collier's, March 1934
 "A Man Named Thin", Ellery Queen's Mystery Magazine, March 1961
 "An Inch and a Half of Glory", posthumously published in The New Yorker, June 2013

Film

Screenplay
 Watch on the Rhine, 1943 (based on Hellman's play)

Original story
 City Streets, 1931
 Mister Dynamite, 1935
 After the Thin Man, 1936
 Another Thin Man, 1939

Articles
 "The Great Lovers",  The Smart Set, November 1922
 "From the Memoirs of a Private Detective", The Smart Set, March 1923
 "In Defence of the Sex Story", The Writer's Digest, June 1924
 "Three Favorites", Black Mask, November 1924, Short autobiographies of Francis James, Dashiell Hammett and C. J. Daly.
 "Vamping Sampson", The Editor, May 1925

On advertising
 
 
 
 
 
Examples of Hammett's advertising copy for the Albert S. Samuels Company, a San Francisco jewelers, are given in:

Letters

Daily comic strips
 Secret Agent X-9. 1934. King Features Syndicate (appeared in most of  William Randolph Hearst's newspapers)

Other publications 
 Creeps by Night; Chills and Thrills. John Day, 1931. Anthology edited by Hammett.
 The Battle of the Aleutians. Field Force Headquarters, Adak, Alaska, 1944. Text by Hammett and Robert Colodny. Illustrations by Harry Fletcher.
 Return of the Thin Man. Mysterious Press, 2012. . Screen treatments of After the Thin Man and Another Thin Man, edited by Richard Layman and Julie M. Rivett.

Unpublished stories 
In 2011, magazine editor Andrew Gulli found fifteen previously unknown short stories by Dashiell Hammett in the archives of the Harry Ransom Center at the University of Texas in Austin.

Collections

Novels
  Includes Red Harvest, The Dain Curse and The Maltese Falcon.
 
  Includes The Maltese Falcon and The Glass Key.

Short fiction
Because of their popularity, Hammett's short stories were collected in many anthologies by different publishers. After their initial publication in pulp magazines, they were first collected in ten digest-sized paperbacks by Mercury Publications under an imprint, either Bestsellers Mystery,  A Jonathan Press Mystery or Mercury Mystery. The stories were edited by Ellery Queen (Frederic Dannay) and were abridged versions of the original publications.  Some of these digests were reprinted as hardcovers by World Publishing under the imprint Tower Books. The anthologies were also republished as Dell mapbacks. An important collection, The Big Knockover and Other Stories, edited by Lillian Hellman, helped revive Hammett's literary reputation in the 1960s and fostered a new series of anthologies. However, most of these used Dannay's abridged version of the stories. Steven Marcus, while editing the collection for the Library of America, was the first to return to the original magazine texts.

Mercury Publications
 $106,000 Blood Money. Bestseller Mystery B40, 1943. Collection of two connected Continental Op stories, "The Big Knockover" and "$106,000 Blood Money".
 The Adventures of Sam Spade. Bestseller Mystery B50, 1944. Collection of three Spade stories and four others.
 They Can Only Hang You Once and Other Stories. Mercury Mystery B50, 1949. Reprint of Bestseller Mystery B50.
 The Continental Op. Bestseller Mystery B62, 1945. Collection of four Continental Op stories.
 The Continental Op. Jonathan Press Mystery  J40, 1949. Reprint of Bestseller Mystery B62.
 The Return of the Continental Op. Jonathan Press Mystery J17, 1945. Collection of five further Continental Op stories.
 Hammett Homicides. Bestseller Mystery B81, 1946. Collection of six stories, four of which feature the Continental Op.
 Dead Yellow Women. Jonathan Press Mystery J29, 1947. Collection of six stories, four of which feature the Continental Op.
 Nightmare Town. Mercury Mystery #120, 1948. Collection of four stories, two of which feature the Continental Op.
 The Creeping Siamese.  Jonathan Press Mystery J48, 1950. Collection of six stories, three of which feature the Continental Op.
 Woman in the Dark. Jonathan Press Mystery J59, 1951. Collection of the three part novelette.
 A Man Named Thin. Mercury Mystery #233, 1962. Collection of eight stories, one of which features the Continental Op.

World Publishing
 Blood Money. Tower, 1943. Hardcover edition of Bestseller Mystery B40.
 The Adventures of Sam Spade and other stories. 1945. Hardcover edition of Bestseller Mystery B50.

Dell
 Blood Money. Dell #53, 1944. Mapback reprint of Bestseller Mystery B40.
 Blood Money. Dell #486, 1951. Mapback reprint of Bestseller Mystery B40.
 A Man Called Spade and Other Stories.  Dell #90, 1945. Mapback reprint of Bestseller Mystery B50 but omits two stories: Nightshade and The Judge Laughed Last.
 A Man Called Spade and Other Stories.  Dell #411, 1950. Reprint of  Dell #90.
 A Man Called Spade and Other Stories.  Dell #452, 1952. Reprint of  Dell #90.
 The Continental Op.  Dell #129, 1946. Reprint of Bestseller Mystery B62.
 The Return of the Continental Op. Dell #154, 1947. Reprint of Jonathan Press Mystery J17.
 Hammett Homicides. Dell #223, 1948. Mapback reprint of Bestseller Mystery B81.
 Dead Yellow Women. Dell #308, 1949. Mapback reprint of Jonathan Press Mystery J29.
 Dead Yellow Women. Dell #421, 1950. Mapback reprint of Jonathan Press Mystery J29.
 Nightmare Town. Dell #379, 1950. Mapback reprint of Mercury Mystery #120.
 The Creeping Siamese. Dell #538, 1951. Mapback reprint of Jonathan Press Mystery J48, 1950.

Later collections
Along with the novels, these later collections have been reprinted in paperback versions under many imprints: Vintage Crime, Black Lizard, Everyman's library.
 The Big Knockover. Random House, 1966. Including the unfinished novel Tulip.
 The Continental Op. Random House, 1974. Edited and with an introduction by Steven Marcus. Comprises 7 stories. 
 Woman in the Dark. Knopf, 1988. Hardcover collection of the three parts of the title novelette, with an introduction by Robert B. Parker. 
 Nightmare Town. Knopf, 1999. Hardcover collection, with contents different from the digest of the same title.
 Crime Stories and Other Writings (Steven Marcus, ed.) (Library of America, 2001); .
 Lost Stories. Vince Emery Productions, 2005. Collection of 21 stories not been previously published in hardcover, including some previously unpublished stories, with several long commentaries on Hammett's career providing context for the stories. Introduction by Joe Gores. 
 Vintage Hammett. New York : Vintage Books, 2005. Collection nine stories of Sam Spade, Nick and Nora Charles, and The Continental Op. 
 The Hunter and Other Stories. Mysterious Press, 2014. Collection of previously unpublished or uncollected stories and screenplays, including a fragment of a second Sam Spade novel. Edited by Richard Layman and Julie M. Rivett. 
 The Black Lizard Big Book of Black Mask Stories. New York : Vintage Crime/Black Lizard, Vintage Books, a division of Penguin Random House LLC, [2010].  Reprints The Maltese Falcon in its original serialized form.
 The Big Book of the Continental Op. New York : Vintage Crime/Black Lizard, Vintage Books, a division of Penguin Random House LLC, [2017]. Collects all twenty-eight stories and two serialized novels starring Continental Op, plus the previously unpublished fragment "Three Dimes."

Daily comic strips
 Secret Agent X-9 Book 1. David McKay Publications, 1934. Collection of the comic strip written by Hammett and illustrated by Alex Raymond.
 Secret Agent X-9 Book 2. David McKay Publications, 1934. A second collection of the comic strip.
 Secret Agent X-9. Nostalgia Press, NY, 1976.
 Dashiell Hammett's Secret Agent X-9. International Polygonics Ltd, 1983. 
 Secret Agent X-9. Kitchen Sink Press, 1990. 
 Secret Agent X-9. IDW Publishing, 2015. . Collection of the comic strip written by Hammett and Leslie Charteris and illustrated by Alex Raymond.

Adaptations

Film
 Roadhouse Nights, 1930 (adaptation of Red Harvest)
 The Maltese Falcon, 1931
 Woman in the Dark, 1934
 The Thin Man, 1934
 The Glass Key, 1935
 Satan Met a Lady, 1936 (adaptation of The Maltese Falcon)
 After the Thin Man, 1936
 Another Thin Man, 1939
 The Maltese Falcon,1941
 The Glass Key, 1942
 No Good Deed, 2002 (adaptation of "The House in Turk Street")

Sequels based on characters created by Hammett
 Shadow of the Thin Man (1941)
 The Thin Man Goes Home (1945)
 Song of the Thin Man (1947)

Serial based on characters created by Hammett
 Secret Agent X-9, 1937, Universal Pictures
 Secret Agent X-9, 1945, Universal Pictures

Film based on characters created by Hammett
 The Fat Man, 1951, Universal Pictures

Radio
 The Thin Man,  June 8, 1936, Lux Radio Theatre (with William Powell and Myrna Loy)
 After the Thin Man, June 17, 1940, Lux Radio Theatre (with William Powell and Myrna Loy)
 The Maltese Falcon, February 1, 1942, Silver Theater (with Humphrey Bogart)
 The Maltese Falcon, August 14, 1942, Philip Morris Playhouse (with Edward Arnold (actor))
 The Maltese Falcon, February 8, 1943, Lux Radio Theatre (with Edward G. Robinson and Laird Cregar)
 The Maltese Falcon, September 20, 1943, The Screen Guild Theater (with Humphrey Bogart, Mary Astor, Sidney Greenstreet and Peter Lorre)
 The Maltese Falcon, July 3, 1946, Academy Award Theatre (with Humphrey Bogart, Mary Astor, Sidney Greenstreet)
 The Glass Key, July 22, 1946, The Screen Guild Theater (with  Alan Ladd, Marjorie Reynolds, Ward Bond)
 Two Sharp Knives, December 22, 1942, Suspense (with  Stuart Erwin)
 Two Sharp Knives, June 7, 1945, Suspense (with  John Payne and Frank McHugh)
 Dashiell Hammett – Secret Agent X-9, January 5, 1994, BBC Radio 5, (Radio drama of Hammett's first Secret Agent X-9 script)

Series based on characters created by Hammett
 The Thin Man 1941, NBC; 1946, CBS; 1948, NBC; 1950, ABC
 The Adventures of Sam Spade 1946, CBS; 1949, NBC
 The Fat Man 1946–1950, ABC
 The Fat Man 1954–1955, Australian Broadcasting Corporation

Comic book
 The Maltese Falcon, 1946, Feature Book #48, David McKay Publications for King Features Syndicate (Hammett's original dialogue and art by Rodlow Willard)

Television
 Two Sharp Knives, 1949, Studio One on CBS (with Stanley Ridges and Abe Vigoda)
 The Thin Man, 1957–1959, MGM Television for NBC (with Peter Lawford and Phyllis Kirk)
 The Dain Curse, 1978, CBS (with James Coburn as the Continental Op)
 Fly Paper, 1995, Season 2 episode 7 of the TV anthology series Fallen Angels (with Christopher Lloyd as the Continental Op)

See also

References

Further reading

Bibliography
 Mundell, E. H. (1968). A List of the Original Appearances of Dashiell Hammett's Magazine Work. Kent State University.
 Layman, Richard. (1979). Dashiell Hammett: A Descriptive Bibliography. Pittsburgh Series in Bibliography, University of Pittsburgh Press.
 Lovisi, Gary (1994). Dashiell Hammett and Raymond Chandler: A Checklist and Bibliography of Their Paperback Appearances. Gryphon Books.

Biography and criticism 

 Beunat, Natalie (1997). Dashiell Hammett: Parcours d'une oeuvre. Amiens: Encrage Edition.
 Braun, Martin (1977). Prototypen der amerikanischen Kriminalerzählung: Die Romane und Kurzgeschichten Carroll John Daly und Dashiell Hammett. Frankfurt: Lang.
 Duggan, Eddie (2000) 
 Fechheimer, David, ed. (1975). City of San Francisco: Dashiell Hammett Issue. 4 November 4, 1975. San Francisco: City Publishing.
 Gale, Robert L. (2000). A Dashiell Hammett Companion. Westport, Connecticut: Greenwood Press.
 Gregory, Sinda (1985). Private Investigations: The Novels of Dashiell Hammett. Carbondale: Southern Illinois University Press.
 Hammett, Jo (2001). Dashiell Hammett: A Daughter Remembers. Carroll and Graf.
 Hellman, Lillian. An Unfinished Woman. Pentimento. Scoundrel Time. Memoirs containing much material about Hammett.
 Herron, Don (2009). The Dashiell Hammett Tour: Thirtieth Anniversary Guidebook. San Francisco: Vince Emery Productions.
 Jaemmrich, Armin (2016). The American Noir – A Rehabilitation, 
 Johnson, Diane (1983). Dashiell Hammett: A Life. New York: Random House.
 Joshi, S. T. (2019). "Dashiell Hammett: Sam Spade and Others" in Varieties of Crime Fiction (Wildside Press) .
 Layman, Richard (1981). Shadow Man:  The Life of Dashiell Hammett. New York: Harcourt Brace Jovanovich.
 Layman, Richard (2000). Literary Masters. Vol. 3, Dashiell Hammett. Detroit: Gale Group.
 Layman, Richard, ed. (2005). Clues: A Journal of Detection. Theme issue, Dashiell Hammett. Winter 2005. Washington D.C.: Heldref Publications.
 Locke, John (December 21, 2019). "Hammett Takes on the Writing Racket." Up and Down these Mean Streets.
 Lopez, Jesus Angel Gonzalez (2004). La Narrativa Popular de Dashiell Hammett: Pulps, Cine, y Comics. Biblioteca Javier Coy d'Estudis Nord-Americans, Universitat de Valencia.
 Marling, William (1983). Dashiell Hammett. New York: Twayne.
 Maurin, Maria Jose Alvarez (1994). Claves Para un Enigma: La Poetica del Misterio en la Narrativa de Dashiell Hammett. Universidad de Leon.
 Mellon, Joan (1996). Hellman and Hammett. New York: Harper Collins.
 Metress, Christopher, ed. (1994). The Critical Response to Dashiell Hammett. Westport, Connecticut: Greenwood Press.
 Nolan, William F. (1969). Dashiell Hammett: A Casebook. Santa Barbara: McNally & Lofin.
 Nolan, William F. (1983). Hammett: A Life at the Edge. New York: Congdon & Weed.
 Panek, Leroy Lad (2004). Reading Early Hammett: A Critical Study of the Fiction Prior to The Maltese Falcon. Jefferson, North Carolina: McFarland.
 Symons, Julian (1985). Dashiell Hammett. New York: Harcourt Brace Jovanovich.
 Thompson, George J. "Rhino" (2007). Hammett's Moral Vision. San Francisco: Vince Emery Productions.
 Ward, Nathan (2015). The Lost Detective: Becoming Dashiell Hammett. New York: Bloomsbury USA.

External links

 Checklist of where many Hammett stories have been published
 PBS American Masters portrait of Hammett
 
 Dashiell Hammett bio and novels analyzed at detnovel.com
 Dashiell Hammett on The Thrilling Detective Website

Libraries
 Dashiell Hammett family papers at the University of South Carolina Irvin Department of Rare Books and Special Collections.
 Richard Layman collection of Dashiell Hammett at the University of South Carolina Irvin Department of Rare Books and Special Collections.
 Library of Congress lecture by Hammett estate trustee and biographer Richard Layman on the 75th anniversary of The Maltese Falcon
 Dashiell Hammett Collection at the Harry Ransom Center at the University of Texas at Austin

Online editions
 
 

 
1894 births
1961 deaths
20th-century American male writers
20th-century American novelists
American communists
American detective fiction writers
American male novelists
American male short story writers
American short story writers
United States Army personnel of World War I
United States Army personnel of World War II
American mystery writers
Baltimore Polytechnic Institute alumni
Burials at Arlington National Cemetery
Roman Catholic writers
Catholics from Maryland
American copywriters
Deaths from lung cancer in New York (state)
Former Roman Catholics
Hollywood blacklist
Mount Pleasant, New York
Novelists from Maryland
The New Yorker people
Pinkerton (detective agency)
People from St. Mary's County, Maryland
Private detectives and investigators
Pulp fiction writers
United States Army soldiers
Screenwriters from Maryland
American Noir writers
20th-century American screenwriters
Lost Generation writers